The Marxist–Leninist Organization of Afghanistan (abbr. MLOA) is a Maoist political organization in Afghanistan. It participates in the International Conference of Marxist–Leninist Parties and Organizations (International Newsletter) (ICMLPO).
 
The MLOA has been publishing the journal Eagle since August 2011.

References

Communist parties in Afghanistan
Anti-revisionist organizations
Maoist organisations in Afghanistan
International Conference of Marxist–Leninist Parties and Organizations (International Newsletter)
International Coordination of Revolutionary Parties and Organizations